Bopanna is a surname from Karnataka, India. It is found amongst Kodavas. Notable people with the surname include:

Daisy Bopanna (born 1982), Indian actress
P. T. Bopanna (born 1950), Indian author and journalist 
Rohan Bopanna (born 1980), Indian tennis player

Indian surnames